The Višegrad massacres were acts of mass murder committed against the Bosniak civilian population of the town and municipality of Višegrad during the ethnic cleansing of eastern Bosnia by Serb police and military forces during the spring and summer of 1992, at the start of the Bosnian War.

According to documents of the International Criminal Tribunal for the former Yugoslavia (ICTY), based on the victims reports, some 3,000 Bosniaks were murdered during the violence in Višegrad and its surroundings, including some 600 women and 119 children. According to the ICTY, Višegrad was subjected to "one of the most comprehensive and ruthless campaigns of ethnic cleansing in the Bosnian conflict". According to the Research and Documentation Center, 1661 Bosniaks (both soldiers and civilians) were killed or missing in Višegrad.

The viciousness of the crimes of violence committed by the Bosnian Serbs in the Višegrad massacres and the effectiveness with which the town's entire Bosniak population was either killed or deported by Serb forces in 1992, long before similar events in Srebrenica, have been described as epitomising the genocide of the Bosniak population of eastern Bosnia carried out on orders from the Bosnian Serb leader Radovan Karadžić and his military counterpart General Ratko Mladić.

Massacres
On 6 April 1992, the Yugoslav People's Army (JNA) occupied Višegrad after several days of fighting. Upon seizing the town, they formed the Serbian Municipality of Višegrad and took control of all municipal government offices. On 19 May 1992, the JNA officially withdrew from the town. Soon thereafter, local Serbs, the police and paramilitaries began one of the most notorious campaigns of ethnic cleansing in the conflict, designed to permanently rid the town of its Bosniak population. The ruling Serb Democratic Party declared Višegrad to be a "Serb" town. All non-Serbs lost their jobs, and the murders began. Serb forces (sometimes referred to as the "White Eagles" and "Avengers" and associated with Vojislav Šešelj, leader of the Serbian ultra-nationalist Serbian Radical Party) attacked and destroyed a number of Bosniak villages. A large number of unarmed Bosniak civilians in the town of Višegrad were killed because of their ethnicity. Hundreds of Bosniaks were killed in random shootings.

Except for an apparently small number who escaped, all of the able-bodied Bosniak men and youths of Višegrad who had not fled the town were shot or otherwise killed, according to survivors. According to the 1991 Yugoslav census, Višegrad municipality had a population of about 21,000 before the conflict, 63% Bosniak and 33% Bosnian Serb.

Every day Bosniak men, women and children were killed on the Drina river bridge and their bodies were dumped into the river. Many of the Bosniak men and women were arrested and detained at various locations in the town. Serb soldiers raped women and inflicted terror on civilians. Looting and destruction of Bosniak and Croat property occurred daily and mosques in Višegrad were destroyed. Serb forces were also implicated in the widespread and systematic looting and destruction of Bosniak homes and villages. Both of the town's mosques were demolished. Many of the Bosniaks who were not immediately killed were detained at various locations in the town, as well as the former JNA military barracks at Uzamnica, 5 kilometres outside of Višegrad; some were detained in the hotel Vilina Vlas or other detention sites in the area. The Vilina Vlas hotel served as a "brothel" camp. Bosniak women and girls, including many not yet 14 years old, were brought to the camp by police officers and members of the paramilitary groups the White Eagles and Arkan's and Vojislav Šešelj's men.

Bridge murders

According to the survivors and the report submitted to UNHCR by the Bosnian government, the Drina river was used to dump many of the bodies of the Bosniak men, women and children who were killed around the town and on the famous Mehmed Paša Sokolović Bridge, as well as the new one. Day after day, truckloads of Bosniak civilians were taken down to the bridge and riverbank by Serb paramilitaries, unloaded, shot, and thrown into the river.

On 10 June 1992, Milan Lukić entered the Varda factory and collected seven Bosniak men from their workstations. He thereafter took them down to the bank of the Drina river in front of the factory, where he lined them up. He then shot them in full view of a number of onlookers, including the wife and daughter of one of the victims, Ibrišim Memišević. All seven men were killed.

In a report submitted to the UNHCR in 1993 by the Government of Bosnia and Herzegovina, it was alleged that, on another occasion, during the murder of a group of 22 people on 18 June 1992, Lukić's group tore out the kidneys of several individuals, while the others were tied to cars and dragged through the streets; their children were thrown from the bridge and shot at before they hit the water.

In the summer of 2010, when the waters of Perućac Lake and the Drina upstream of the lake were lowered as a result of maintenance work on the Bajina Bašta dam, the remains of over 300 victims were retrieved for identification.

Pionirska Street fire and the Bikavac fire
In the Pionirska Street fire, on 14 June 1992, a group of 70 Bosniak civilians, mainly from the village of Koritnik, were locked en masse in a house on Pionirska Street, Višegrad. Some of the women were taken out and raped before being returned to the house. A grenade was then thrown inside, killing some.  The house was then set ablaze and the occupants were left to burn to death. 59 people were killed but a handful survived. All of the survivors who were still alive came to testify before the ICTY Trial Chamber at the trial of Lukić's cousins.

In the Bikavac fire on 27 June 1992, approximately 70 Bosniak civilians were forced into one room in a house in the settlement of Bikavac, near Višegrad.  After the captives were robbed, the house was set on fire and the occupants were burned alive. The Trial Chamber found that at least 60 Bosniak civilians were killed. Zehra Turjačanin testified in relation to this incident:

Paklenik massacre

On 14 June 1992, dozens of Bosniak men were separated from an organized civilian convoy leaving Višegrad and were systematically executed the next day by soldiers from the Bosnian Serb army's Višegrad Brigade, in what came to be known as the Paklenik Massacre. Around 50 Bosniak civilians were shot and their bodies were dumped in a ravine called Propast (Downfall). The sole survivor, Ferid Spahić, was a key witness in the Mitar Vasiljević and Nenad Tanasković cases.

Bosanska Jagodina massacre

On 26 May 1992, the SDS-led Municipality organized buses to deport Bosniaks from Višegrad to Macedonia. Near Bosanska Jagodina, 17 male Bosniaks were taken off the bus and murdered in front of eyewitnesses in what is known as the Bosanska Jagodina massacre. Their remains were discovered in a mass grave in 2006. It is believed that this war crime was most probably carried out by the paramilitary group the "Avengers" led by Milan Lukić, under the control of the Army of the Republika Srpska.

Barimo Massacre

In August 1992, the Army of the Republika Srpska attacked Barimo, burnt down the entire village and religious buildings. A total of 26 Bosniak civilians were killed. A large number of them were women and children. The oldest victim was Halilović Hanka, born in 1900 and the youngest was Bajrić Fadila Emir, born in 1980.

Perućac Lake exhumations

In July and August 2010, when the level of the Perućac reservoir water behind the Bajina Bašta hydroelectric dam was lowered while maintenance and repair work was being done on the dam, the remains of many civilians who perished in the Višegrad massacres in 1992, in the early days of the Bosnian war, were discovered. The bodies of victims from the 1999 Kosovo conflict are also thought to be in the lake.

Between 19 July and 9 August 2010 the remains of 60 individuals people had been found in Lake Perućac. Amor Mašović, Chairman of the Bosnian Institute for Missing Persons, who was in charge of forensic investigations at the lake, believed that they had all been killed in Višegrad or a few kilometres further upstream in Muhići and Kurtalići, and their bodies thrown into the Drina. When the bodies reached the lake they were snagged by branches or became stuck in the shallow mud and sand.

Divers also searched for bodies of Kosovar Albanians from the refrigerator truck dumped in the lake in 1999. Although dozens of bodies were recovered from the truck when it was discovered in 2003 more are thought to be in the lake, as the vehicle's doors were open when it was found.

Representatives of missing persons commissions from Serbia and Kosovo joined the Institute team in carrying out a joint examination of an eight-kilometre stretch of the lake. Members of the Institute's team were shot at from the village of Blace, near Višegrad, about 10 days after they began the search.

The remains of at least three German Wehrmacht soldiers from World War II were also discovered during the 2010 investigations.

Amor Mašović believed that there were over 2,000 bodies in the lake, making it "the largest mass grave in Europe".  As of 23 September 2010 remains of 373 bodies, believed to be mostly those of victims of the Višegrad massacres, had been retrieved from the reservoir, which was due to commence refilling on 26 September. 

Many volunteers joined the official teams searching for the bodies but the Serbian authorities, criticized by Mašović for hampering the work, were insistent that the dam be brought back into service and refilled before the recovery work was complete.

On 26 October 2010, Mašović told a press conference in Sarajevo that 396 "cases" had been discovered during the two and a half month investigation. He used the term "cases", rather than "victims", because in some instances only a bone, leg, arm or rib had been found, not a complete skeleton. However he believed that between 97 and 120 victims might be identified after forensic analysis of the remains. These included six Austro-Hungarian soldiers from World War I but most were Bosniaks from Višegrad. Mašović noted that at least 800 people were still missing from Višegrad since the 1992-95 war. Veljko Odalović, head of the Serbian Commission for Missing Persons, told the press conference that discovering the fate of 14,500 victims war listed as missing in the former Yugoslavia was a "civilisation and humanitarian" issue and a precondition for reconciliation and the stabilisation of relations.

Eliticide
Eliticide is defined as the systematic killing of a community's political and economic leadership so that the community cannot regenerate. After the Yugoslav People's Army occupied Višegrad, the Serb Crisis Committee ("krizni stab" led by the Serb Democratic Party) took control of the municipality. Leading Bosniak intellectuals, political leaders and activists, members of the Islamic Religious Community (Islamska Vjerska Zajednica) and police officers were expelled from work, arrested, jailed, called for "informative talks", or kept under house arrest. Serb police officials gave Serb paramilitary groups lists of Bosniaks who possessed firearms. The paramilitary groups then went individually man to man and asked them to turn in their firearms. Bosniak intellectuals were systematically murdered.

Trials
 
In 1996, Milan Lukić, his cousin Sredoje Lukić and Mitar Vasiljević were indicted by the International Criminal Tribunal for the former Yugoslavia in The Hague for persecution's as a crime against humanity and the "extermination of a significant number of civilians, including women, children and the elderly." In his sentence the tribunal concluded that Lukić and his troops may have killed thousands of people in the period between 1992 and 1993.

Dragutin Dragićević is serving a 20-year sentence, Đorđe Šević was convicted to 15 years, while two others were sentences to 20 years in absentia, Milan Lukić, who was in the meanwhile arrested and extradited to the Hague Tribunal and Oliver Krsmanović, remains a fugitive. The Hague Tribunal sentenced Mitar Vasiljević to 15 years for crimes against humanity. The International Criminal Tribunal for the former Yugoslavia and the Court of Bosnia and Herzegovina has processed the following for war crimes in Višegrad:

 Milan Lukić  (Life)
 Sredoje Lukić (30 years, 27 years upon appeal)
 Mitar Vasiljević (20 years, 15 years upon appeal)
 Boban Šimšić (14 years)
 Željko Lelek (13 years)
 Momir Savić (18 years)
 Nenad Tanasković (12 years, 8 years upon appeal)
 Novo Rajak (14 years)
 Oliver Krsmanović (charged)

In popular culture and media
An account of the massacre is depicted in the journalistic comic Safe Area Goražde by Joe Sacco.

In 2013 Bosnian film director and screenwriter Jasmila Žbanić made a feature film For Those Who Can Tell No Tales subjecting Višegrad massacres.

On 11 August 2005, journalist Ed Vulliamy described the situation of Višegrad in The Guardian:

On 8 February 2008, American Congressman John Olver, called for the remembrance of genocide in Bosnia and Herzegovina and specially paid attention the war crimes in Visegrad:

See also
List of massacres in Bosnia and Herzegovina
Massacres of Bosniaks

References

Further reading
Love Thy Neighbor: A Story of War by Peter Maass
Wie der Soldat das Grammofon repariert by Saša Stanišic

External links
 Visegrad Genocide Memories 
Bloody trail of butchery at the bridge by Ed Vulliamy, The Guardian, March 11, 1996
'The river took him' by Roy Gutman, Newsday, July 3, 1992
The warlord of Visegrad by Ed Vulliamy and Nerma Jelacic, The Guardian, August 

Massacres in 1992
Bosnian genocide
Massacres in the Bosnian War
Serbian war crimes in the Bosnian War
1992 in Bosnia and Herzegovina